Keep Posted (later known as The Big Issue is an American public affairs TV series on the DuMont Television Network which was sponsored by The Saturday Evening Post for its first two seasons.

Broadcast history
Keep Posted is a 30-minute program that aired on DuMont on Tuesdays at 8:30 pm EST  from October 9, 1951, to January 18, 1954. The title was changed to The Big Issue after the Post stopped sponsoring the program in May 1953. 

Martha Rountree was the moderator, and Lawrence Spivak and Ray Wood were among the panelists. Both Rountree and Spivak were involved in the creation of Meet the Press on NBC.

Episodes included one in which United States Senators Robert A. Taft and Richard B. Russell debated foreign policy on April 22, 1952.

Episode status
Only two episodes are known to exist, "Peace in the Middle East" (first broadcast November 2, 1952), held by the Paley Center for Media, along with another 1952 episode "Should Truman Be Renominated?" as part of the Peabody Award collection.

See also
List of programs broadcast by the DuMont Television Network
List of surviving DuMont Television Network broadcasts

References

Bibliography
David Weinstein, The Forgotten Network: DuMont and the Birth of American Television (Philadelphia: Temple University Press, 2004) 
Alex McNeil, Total Television, Fourth edition (New York: Penguin Books, 1980) 
Tim Brooks and Earle Marsh, The Complete Directory to Prime Time Network TV Shows, Third edition (New York: Ballantine Books, 1964)

External links
Keep Posted at IMDB
DuMont historical website

DuMont Television Network original programming
1951 American television series debuts
1954 American television series endings
Black-and-white American television shows